Gold Coast United Football Club is an Australian soccer club based in Gold Coast, Queensland. The earliest incarnation of the club formed in 1966 and its home ground was at Nikiforides Family Park in Broadbeach. The first era of Gold Coast United senior teams competed in the Brisbane leagues until the club disbanded after the 1979 season, allowing Broadbeach United Soccer Club to form its first senior team in 1980 at the same grounds.

Twenty-eight years later the club was revived and was officially announced as a professional expansion team for the A-League's 2009–2010 season on 28 August 2008. It was the second bid accepted by the league, with an unrelated bid known as Gold Coast Galaxy FC preceding it. The club was owned by Clive Palmer, the wealthiest man in Queensland, until the FFA took over the club's A-League licence in February 2012, and officially folding on 25 March 2012 and its intellectual property being surrendered to Football Federation Australia.

In their first two A-League seasons, Gold Coast were one of the strongest clubs in the A-League, finishing in the top four on both occasions and making the finals series. Although in their third season, the team's form dropped due to off-field instability surrounding player contracts, coaching staff and community support. Since their inception, Gold Coast were criticised about their low attendance. In their first season, they averaged close to 5,500 people and in their second season, they averaged just under 3,300 people per game, making them the lowest attended team. On 29 February 2012, the FFA revoked Palmer's Gold Coast United A-League licence.

On 3 August 2017, it was announced that they would be joining the National Premier League Queensland to compete in both Men's and Women's competitions.

History

Origins
In 1966 the club was formed with the first team consisting of players from varying nationalities and backgrounds, all seeking to take the first Gold Coast based soccer team north with a view to be a representative side playing in the Brisbane competitions of the day which were considered at the time to be stronger than the Gold Coast competitions. The club's first uniform was black and white with a split colour scheme down the centre of the shirt. In 1968 the club adopted the current blue and gold colours for the first time. The original team found immediate success in the Brisbane lower divisions and won their first two seasons comfortably. Over several years the club quickly ascended through multiple promotions into the upper divisions of Brisbane's soccer leagues, peaking in 1978 with a second-place finish in Brisbane's Division 2 competition. At the conclusion of the 1979 season, despite earning much fame and praise locally, the club disbanded with remaining players dissolving into a newly formed senior team for Broadbeach United Soccer Club.

In 2008 a consortium under the working title of "Gold Coast Galaxy FC", led by real estate magnate Fred Taplin was, along with North Queensland Thunder, considered for admission for the 2008–2009 season however Football Federation Australia delayed expansion of the league until at least the 2009–2010 season. The Galaxy was strongly expected to join in the 2008–2009 season along with North Queensland Thunder, expanding the league to ten teams. Although the Galaxy bid appeared to have good support, the Thunder bid appeared much less secure, particularly after a major financial backer pulled out of the franchise on 5 March 2008. The FFA determined on 11 March that neither team would be granted entry "in the best interests of the league," given that a nine team format was generally unfavoured. Clive Palmer, who originally owned the club fully, sold a 10 percent share of Gold Coast to close friends who live in Melbourne at the start of 2007 when the club were not fully expected to be given a licence into the A-League.

During the off-season prior to the 2008–2009 season, a number of players were touted to join the club and it made some tentative signings, including former Queensland Roar manager Miron Bleiberg, goalkeeper Scott Higgins, and former Wellington Phoenix Brazilian player Felipe. Without entry into 2008–2009 season, the players became free agents and could still sign for the 2009–2010 season depending on the terms of their next club contracts. The franchise was also linked at times with signing Nwankwo Kanu as their "marquee" player.

The name 'Galaxy' was an interim name and it was always undetermined whether or not that name would be used by the club as a permanent name. Galaxy was said to have ties to American Major League Soccer club Los Angeles Galaxy, which would have meant pre-season warm-up matches and possible player sharing opportunities. Indeed, in February 2008 there was even talk of David Beckham turning out for a pre-season match. The Galaxy consortium had planned to market the club deep into Northern New South Wales, down to Coffs Harbour.

Formation
The club's formation in 1966 was a significant forward step for Gold Coast soccer with Gold Coast United being the first team to take on the Brisbane competition leagues and showcase the talent emerging from the rapidly growing coastal city. The first teams consisted of players from varying nationalities and cultures combining with local players and were regarded as a formidable side by local media. The club continued to grow throughout a 13-year period and became a regular feature in the sports media pages of Brisbane and Gold Coast newspapers before disbanding in 1979.

In the late 2000s, soccer community and business leaders explored the idea of reforming the club in a pitch to enter a Gold Coast soccer team into the national A-League competition. Gold Coast United was reformed and a campaign to enter the A-League in 2008 fell short when the FFA decided not to have new franchises in 2008–2009 leaving the club to focus towards the 2009–2010 season. At the time, the club was 70 percent owned by Clive Palmer, the richest man in Queensland, and the other 30 percent was owned by 3 unidentified men. The local rival Galaxy consortium's chances of entering the A-League were dealt a severe blow in June 2008 when the United consortium headed by real estate and mining businessman Clive Palmer entered talks with the FFA. On 3 June 2008, Fred Taplin announced that the Gold Coast Galaxy had dropped out of the race for the Gold Coast licence and a place in the A-League 'in the interests of football'. The same day, FFA chief Ben Buckley confirmed that Gold Coast United and the Palmer consortium had succeeded in securing the franchise. On 6 June, Palmer signed a provisional agreement with the FFA to field a team in the 2009–2010 season. The press conference was held at Robina Stadium, further reinforcing the suggestion that the new franchise will play at the 27,000 capacity stadium. Palmer declared that he would build a side capable of winning the League in its first season.

2010–11 season
On 9 April 2010 it was reported that Clive Palmer had ended his financial support of Gold Coast United, putting the club at risk of instant closure. However, this did not happen, and Palmer retained control of the club. Gold Coast United chief executive Clive Mensink denied the club would fold, but the club would be forced to change its ownership structure.
And after crucial recruitings of Bruce Djite, Peter Perchtold and the re-signing of Shane Smeltz, the team would have the most dangerous attack in the whole of the A-League.

2011–12 season
The 2011–12 season began with several key players departing including Bruce Djite to Adelaide United and the loss of Shane Smeltz to Perth Glory.

On 27 January 2012, Clive Palmer once again caused controversy by deciding to close all but the western grandstand of Skilled Park for the remainder of the A-League season. The action was a form of punishment to the club's fans for a flare which was thrown during their derby against Brisbane Roar. Despite backlash from within the community, Palmer stuck with his word by permanently closing the northern and eastern stands along with the southern stand which was already closed. On 29 February 2012, the FFA revoked Clive Palmer's Gold Coast United's A-League licence, however, they were allowed to play the final four games of the season. As a result, Palmer founded Football Australia  a competing organisation without international affiliates.

2017: Revival
On 3 August 2017, it was announced that the club had been admitted into the National Premier Leagues Queensland competition for the 2018 season.

Season by season record

PO – Playoff
GS – Group stage
EF – Elimination finals
R32 – Round of 32
R16 – Round of 16
QF – Quarter-finals
SF – Semi-finals
RU – Runners-up
W – Winners
DNQ – Did Not Qualify
DQ – Disqualified
Bold denotes player currently plays for club

Colours and badge
The first Gold Coast United team in 1966 played in a black and white uniform, with the left side of the shirt's chest black and the right side white, split down the centre. The uniform also had white shorts and white socks with four thin black lines. The back of the shirt was mirrored to appear the same as the front. The following year the team changed to a blue and gold uniform which it retained until the first incarnation of the club folded in 1979. The original badge for the club was created in 1967 with a simple shield featuring a two-colour split fill of blue on the left and gold on the right. In the centre was a black and white soccer ball and the entire badge was bordered in red and inset with red text reading 'Gold Coast United Soccer Club.'

In 2009 the newly reformed team and club adopted the same colours, which closely resembled the original blue and gold of the 1960s era – being yellow and royal blue. These colours are synonymous with, and representative of, Gold Coast. The club's alternate jersey is all white. The second-era Gold Coast United club badge featured the colours of blue, yellow and white on a skewed shield shape with an artistic image representing the city skyline of Surfers Paradise on the left alongside the ocean and surf on the right.

For the 2011/2012 season, the Hyatt Regency Coolum resort became United's title sponsor replacing Queensland Nickel, a company owned by Clive Palmer. The Hyatt emblem was emblazoned on the front of the club's strip. Other sponsors to have appeared on United's strip include Modern Solar, WAECO and Westpac.

The current uniform and badge for the third era of the club retains similar colours with the badge appearing as a more refined shield shape and depiction of the modern Surfers Paradise skyline along with a distinct curling wave in a lighter tone of blue. The current playing uniform features a prominent golden yellow shirt and dark navy blue short, with matching navy blue socks.

Ground
The original grounds for the club were at Nikiforides Family Park in Broadbeach, the current home of Broadbeach United Soccer Club. The club remained at this location until disbanding in 1979.

When the club was revived in 2008 the home ground was Skilled Park. It shared this ground with the Gold Coast Titans NRL team. It is located in the growth suburb of Robina, next to Robina railway station. Skilled Park is able to seat 27,400 people. Low crowds in 2009 had led to the club capping crowds at 5000. The lowest crowd attendance was 1,141 when they played the Central Coast Mariners FC at Skilled Park, on 22 February 2012 in a 3–3 draw.

In December 2018, the club was granted council access to use the newly constructed fields and facilities at Coplicks Family Sports Park in Tallebudgera Valley as their permanent training and administration base.

Rivalries
Due to its proximity to Brisbane, Gold Coast United's shared a local rivalry against the Brisbane Roar. There was also a local rivalry with North Queensland FC given both clubs status as Queensland clubs.

Perth Glory – (The Iron Ore Cup).  A media-generated rivalry which commenced before the two teams' first meeting, and in honour of the two owners of the clubs, mining magnates Clive Palmer and Tony Sage. The rivalry was represented by a solid gold trophy donated by Clive Palmer, and the trophy was to be contested each time the two teams met. It was considered a minor rivalry match by Perth Glory and Gold Coast supporters. The final head-to-head record for Gold Coast was 4 wins, 2 draws, and 2 losses.

As one of only two clubs located on the Gold Coast, Gold Coast United now shares a local derby rivalry with neighbouring club Gold Coast Knights FC, with season games held at both clubs drawing substantial local crowds.

Supporters
Gold Coast United had a relationship with the Gold Coast United Supporters Club (GCUSC), the major supporter group following the club situated in Bay 30 at games during the club's A-League period.

Managers
 Miron Bleiberg (Aug 2007–12)
 Mike Mulvey (interim) (Feb 2012 – Jun 2012)
 Sean Lane (Oct 2017 – Sep 2018)
 Kristian Rees (Oct 2018 – Sep 2019)
 Shannon McLuckie (Oct 2019 – current)

Records

Top goalscorers

Most appearances

All-time win–loss record

Players who have represented their nation at senior level

Managerial

See also

Expansion of the A-League

References

External links

 
Former A-League Men teams
Association football clubs established in 2008
2008 establishments in Australia
Soccer teams on the Gold Coast, Queensland